The Goldwater rule is Section 7 in the American Psychiatric Association's (APA) Principles of Medical Ethics, which states that psychiatrists have a responsibility to participate in activities contributing to the improvement of the community and the betterment of public health, but they should not give a professional opinion about public figures whom they have not examined in person, and from whom they have not obtained consent to discuss their mental health in public statements. It is named after former US Senator and 1964 presidential nominee Barry Goldwater.

Creation
The issue arose in 1964 when Fact magazine published "The Unconscious of a Conservative: A Special Issue on the Mind of Barry Goldwater". This title played on the title of US Senator Barry Goldwater's bestseller The Conscience of a Conservative. The magazine polled psychiatrists about Goldwater and whether he was fit to be president. Goldwater sued magazine editor Ralph Ginzburg and managing editor Warren Boroson, and in Goldwater v. Ginzburg (July 1969) received damages totaling $75,000 ($ today).

Description
Section 7, which appeared in the first edition of the American Psychiatric Association's (APA) Principles of Medical Ethics in 1973 and is still in effect , says:

Section 7.3 then states:

The prohibition, or the second part of 7.3, is often taken out of context of the public health obligations of Section 7 and the first part of 7.3:

Similar ethical codes in different organizations

American Psychological Association
The APA Ethics Code of the American Psychological Association (a different organization than the American Psychiatric Association) does not have a similar rule explicitly defined in its code of ethics. Instead, the APA suggests that various statements made in different parts of its Ethics Code would apply to cases of the diagnosis of a public figure. In 2016, in response to the New York Times article "Should Therapists Analyze Presidential Candidates?", American Psychological Association President Susan H. McDaniel published a letter in The New York Times in which she offered her opinion and interpretation of the current Ethics Code:

American Medical Association
The American Medical Association, which initially pressured the American Psychiatric Association to include the Goldwater rule after actively supporting Barry Goldwater in 1964, wrote new guidelines into the AMA Code of Medical Ethics in the fall of 2017, stating that physicians should refrain "from making clinical diagnoses about individuals (e.g., public officials, celebrities, persons in the news) they have not had the opportunity to personally examine."

Donald Trump 
In 2016 and 2017, a number of psychiatrists and clinical psychologists faced criticism for violating the Goldwater rule, as they claimed that Donald Trump displayed "an assortment of personality problems, including grandiosity, a lack of empathy, and 'malignant narcissism, and that he has a "dangerous mental illness", despite having never examined him. In defense of this practice, Bandy X. Lee, a forensic psychiatrist at the Yale School of Medicine, wrote in USA Today "[that] diagnostic practices have changed from accepting interviews to observations, so any assertion that a personal interview is mandatory for a valid professional opinion does not hold."

John Gartner, a practicing psychologist, and the leader of the group Duty to Warn, stated in April 2017 that: "We have an ethical responsibility to warn the public about Donald Trump's dangerous mental illness."

The American Psychoanalytic Association (APsaA)—a different organization from the APA—sent a letter on June 6, 2017, that highlighted differences between the APA and APsaA ethical guidelines, stating that "The American Psychiatric Association's ethical stance on the Goldwater Rule applies to its members only.  APsaA does not consider political commentary by its individual members an ethical matter."  In July 2017, the website Stat published an article by Sharon Begley, labeled "exclusive" and titled "Psychiatry Group Tells Members They Can Defy 'Goldwater Rule' and Comment on Trump's Mental Health".  The article, with a photograph of Barry Goldwater as the headline image, stated that "A leading psychiatry group has told its members they should not feel bound by a longstanding rule against commenting publicly on the mental state of public figures", first sourcing the statement to the July 6 American Psychoanalytic Association (APsaA) letter, but also claiming that it "represents the first significant crack in the profession's decades-old united front aimed at preventing experts from discussing the psychiatric aspects of politicians' behavior"; the article then repeatedly referred to the "Goldwater rule", quoted an unnamed source as saying "leadership has been extremely reluctant to make a statement and publicly challenge the American Psychiatric Association", and claimed that an unnamed "official" had said that "Although the American Psychological Association 'prefers' that its members not offer opinions on the psychology of someone they have not examined, it does not have a Goldwater rule and is not considering implementing one".  Yahoo News reporter Michael Walsh criticized the Stat article, saying it was "misleading" by stating that the letter "represents the first significant crack": The American Psychiatric Association retains the Goldwater rule, and the APsaA never had the rule and was not changing.  Also, even though the APsaA has no Goldwater rule for its members and allows its members to give individual opinions about specific political figures, its Executive Councilors unanimously endorsed a policy that "the APsaA as an organization will speak to issues only, not about specific political figures".

In February 2017, Allen Frances wrote a letter to the editor of the New York Times, regarding Trump and narcissistic personality disorder: "I wrote the criteria that define this disorder, and Mr. Trump doesn't meet them." According to the American Psychiatric Association, "saying that a person does not have an illness is also a professional opinion."

In September 2017, Jeffrey A. Lieberman published an article extensively speculating on diagnoses for Donald Trump despite claiming to adhere to the Goldwater rule in the beginning paragraph. He arrived at a diagnosis of "incipient dementia" but faced no sanctions.

On December 5, 2019, a group of mental health professionals led by Yale Medical School psychiatry professor Bandy X. Lee, George Washington University professor John Zinner, and former CIA profiler Jerrold Post, publicly urged the House Judiciary Committee to consider Donald Trump's "dangerous" mental state that was ostensibly arising from his "brittle sense of self-worth" as part of the Congressional impeachment ongoing process.

Since April 2017, Lee has been stating that while she has been an adherent to the Goldwater rule "for over 20 years," the APA was "violating its own rule" by modifying it so that it would not be possible to meet its "affirmative obligation." She formed an organization with thousands of other mental health professionals "in opposition to the American Psychiatric Association, which, with the Trump presidency, not only failed to meet the psychiatric profession's societal responsibility but inhibited individual professionals from doing so." Some accuse the APA of conflict of interest, since it receives federal funding, which had been increased since its actions under the Trump administration.

See also

References

1973 introductions
American Psychiatric Association
American Psychological Association
Ethics in psychiatry
Barry Goldwater
Medical controversies in the United States
Political psychology
Psychiatry controversies